Mewahang Rai  are a linguistic group and an indigenous community, one of the major subgroups of Rai people in eastern Nepal.

References

Languages of Nepal